This list of Indigenous periodicals is a list of periodicals edited by First Nations and other Indigenous people living in Canada. 

 Aboriginal Voices, Toronto, Ontario, 1994-, bimonthly, continues The Runner 
 Alberta Sweetgrass, Edmonton: Aboriginal Multi-Media Society (AMMSA), 1993-, monthly, serves Aboriginal communities throughout Alberta
Anishinabek News, North Bay, Ontario: Union of Ontario Indians, 1990-, monthly (continues Anishinabek)
 The Drum, Scanterbury, Manitoba: Taiga Communications, 1998-, monthly
 The Eastern Door, Kahnawake, Quebec: K. Deer, 1992-, weekly
 First Perspective, Scanterbury, Manitoba: Blue Sky Graphics, 1992-, irregular 
 Ha-Shilth-Sa, Canada's oldest First Nations newspaper, Nuu-chah-nulth, 1974- 
 Healing Words / Le premier pas, Ottawa, Ontario: The Foundation, 1988-, quarterly 
 Kahtou: the voice of B.C. First Nations, Sechelt, British Columbia: K'watamus Publications, 1993-, twice monthly, continues Kahtou News
MAZINA’IGAN, A Chronicle of the Lake Superior Ojibwe, Great Lakes Indian Fish & Wildlife Federation, quarterly
Métis Voyageur, Métis Nation of Ontario, irregular
 Micmac Maliseet Nation News, Truro, Nova Scotia: Confederacy of Mainland Micmacs, 1991-, monthly, continues Micmac Nation News
 The Nation, Montreal, Quebec: Beesum Communications, 1993-, fortnightly
 Nunatsiaq News, Iqaluit, Northwest Territories: Nortext, 1973-, irregular (English and Inuktitut)
 Raven's Eye, Edmonton, Alberta: Aboriginal Multi-Media Society (AMMSA), 1997-, monthly, serves Aboriginal communities throughout British Columbia and Yukon
 Saskatchewan Sage, Edmonton, Alberta: Aboriginal Multi-Media Society (AMMSA), 1996-, monthly, serves Aboriginal communities throughout Saskatchewan
The Turtle Island News, Grand River Territory of the Six Nations, 1994-, weekly, national in scope
 The Two Row Times, Six Nations of the Grand River, Ohsweken, Ontario, English, Mohawk, Cayuga and Onondaga, serves First Nation communities province wide.
 Tusaayaksat, Inuvik, Northwest Territories: Inuvialuit Communications Society, 1983-, bimonthly, English and Inuvialuktun 
SAY Magazine, Winnipeg, Manitoba, 2002-, bi-monthly, 6 issues per year (English)  serves Indigenous Peoples (First Nations, Métis, Inuit) across Canada 
 Windspeaker, Edmonton, Alberta: Aboriginal Multi-Media Society (AMMSA), 1983-, monthly, serves Aboriginal communities throughout Canada

See also
 List of newspapers in Canada
 History of Canadian newspapers

References

 Amy Fisher and Deborah Lee: Native Residential Schools in Canada: A Selective Bibliography. First Nations Periodicals, Libraries and Archives Canada, April 2002
 First Nations Periodical Index

Lists of publications